You're Only Lonely is the third album by American singer-songwriter J. D. Souther, released in 1979. The title song charted as a single on Billboard, reaching No.1 on the Adult Contemporary chart. "White Rhythm & Blues" was covered by Linda Ronstadt on her album Living in the USA.

Reception

In his retrospective review for Allmusic, critic William Ruhlmann gave the album a 4-star rating, highlighting "White Rhythm and Blues" as well as the solo version of the Souther–Hillman–Furay Band song "Trouble in Paradise".

Track listing

Personnel
 J.D. Souther – vocals, guitar
 David Sanborn – alto saxophone
 Tom Scott – tenor saxophone
 Glenn Frey – guitar
 Don Felder – rhythm guitar
 Danny Kortchmar – guitar
 Waddy Wachtel – guitar, harmony vocals
 Fred Tackett – acoustic guitar
 Dan Dugmore – steel guitar
 Kenny Edwards – bass guitar, harmony vocals
 Don Grolnick – piano
 Jai Winding – organ
 John Sebastian – harmonica
 Jackson Browne – vocals on "You're Only Lonely"
 Jorge Calderón – vocals, harmony vocals
 Phil Everly – harmony vocals on "White Rhythm and Blues" and "You're Only Lonely"
 Don Henley – vocals
 Mike Botts – drums
 Rick Marotta – drums

Production
Producer: J.D. Souther
Engineers: Loyd Clifft, Lee Herschberg
Direction: Irving Azoff
Art direction: Jimmy Wachtel
Photography: Jim Shea

Charts

References

J. D. Souther albums
1979 albums
Columbia Records albums
Albums with cover art by Jimmy Wachtel